Talar Posht (also Romanized as Ţālār Posht and Tālār Posht) is a village in Talarpey Rural District, in the Central District of Simorgh County, Mazandaran Province, Iran. At the time of the 2006 census, its population was 406, in 112 families.

References 

Populated places in Simorgh County